Jiří Šefčík (born 14 April 1973) is a Czech rower. He competed in the men's eight event at the 1992 Summer Olympics.

References

External links
 

1973 births
Living people
Czech male rowers
Olympic rowers of Czechoslovakia
Rowers at the 1992 Summer Olympics
People from Jindřichův Hradec
Sportspeople from the South Bohemian Region